Acrolophus sagaritis is a moth of the family Acrolophidae. It is found in Bolivia.

References

Moths described in 1932
sagaritis